St Mary Bourne is a village and civil parish in the Basingstoke and Deane district of Hampshire, England.

Governance
The village of St. Mary Bourne is part of the civil parish of St. Mary Bourne, and is part of the Burghclere, Highclere and St. Mary Bourne ward of Basingstoke and Deane borough council. The borough council is a Non-metropolitan district of Hampshire County Council. It includes Binley, and the hamlets of Swampton and Stoke further up the Bourne rivulet valley.

Geography
The village is in a rural area of downland, with a mixture of farms and woodlands nearby. The Bourne Rivulet flows through the centre of the village and has been known to flood.

Landmarks

It has thatched houses and in the south part of the village is the flint and stone church of St Peter.  The church is notable for its 12th-century Tournai font.

Further reading
 Reverend Stephen Pakenham, with additional material by Canon Martin Coppen The Story of St Peter's Church, St Mary Bourne: A Short Guide for Visitors, 2009 (available from the church)
 A Full Church Guide (available from the church)

References

External links 

 St Mary Bourne Community Hub
 St Mary Bourne Parish Council 
 Stained Glass Windows at St. Peter, St Mary Bourne, Hampshire
 'Parishes: St. Mary Bourne', A History of the County of Hampshire: Volume 4 (1911), pp. 295-299
 St Peter’s, St Mary Bourne

Saint Mary Bourne
Civil parishes in Basingstoke and Deane